The Bobby Dodd Coach of the Year Award is an annual college football award given to the Division I Football Bowl Subdivision head coach whose team excels on the field, in the classroom, and in the community.  The award is named for Bobby Dodd, longtime head football coach at Georgia Tech and was established in 1976 to honor the values that Dodd exemplified.  Award recipients are chosen by a selection committee composed of college football experts and all previous recipients.  The recipient is announced during halftime of the Chick-fil-A Peach Bowl in Atlanta. A formal presentation is held later, usually on the university campus of the recipient. Winners from the previous two seasons, as well as coaches in their first year at their current programs, are ineligible for the award.

Winners
Two coaches have won the award twice: Bill Snyder of Kansas State University, won in 1998 and again in 2012, and Joe Paterno of Penn State who received the award in 1981 and again in 2005. Eight schools have had two different coaches given the award: Alabama with Bill Curry in 1989 and Nick Saban in 2014,   Michigan with Bo Schembechler in 1977 and Lloyd Carr in 2007, Air Force with Ken Hatfield in 1983 and Fisher DeBerry in 1985, Georgia Tech with Bobby Ross in 1990 and George O'Leary in 2000, Northwestern with Gary Barnett in 1995 and Pat Fitzgerald in 2020, TCU with Jim Wacker in 1984 and Gary Patterson in 2009, and Duke with Fred Goldsmith in 1994 and David Cutcliffe in 2013.

References

External links
 
 

College football coach of the year awards in the United States
Awards established in 1976